Roman Ondak (born August 5, 1966) is a Slovak conceptual artist.

Life and career 
Roman Ondak was born in Žilina. He studied at Academy of Fine Arts and Design (Slovak: Vysoká škola výtvarných umení, abbr. VŠVU) in Bratislava from 1988 to 1994.

Roman Ondak has been awarded the 2018 winner of the Lovis Corinth Prize.

Selected works 
 Dubbing (2001)
 Good Feelings In Good Times (2003)
 Spirit and Oportunity (2004)
 It Will All Turn Out Right in the End (2005)
 More Silent Than Ever (2006)
 Measuring the Universe (2007)
 Time Capsule (2011)
 Loop (2009)
 do not walk outside this area (2012)
 Signature (2014)
 Planets I - X (2018)
 New Observations (1995 / 2018)
 Perfect Society (2019)

Exhibitions 

Biennale in Venezia (1999, 2003, 2009, 2011)

 2006: Tate Modern in London (2006)
 2007: Pinakothek der Moderne in München (2007)
 2008: Measuring the Universe, DAAD Galerie, Berlin
 2009: Measuring the Universe, Museum of Modern Art, New York
 2010: Shaking Horizon, Villa Arson, Nice
 2010: Before Waiting Becomes Part of Your Life, Salzburg Kunstverein
 2010-2011: Measuring the Universe, Stedelijk Museum, Amsterdam
 2011: Time Capsule, Modern Art Oxford, Oxford
 2011: Measuring the Universe, Tate St Ives
 2011: Enter the Orbit. Kunsthaus Zürich
 2012: Within Reach of Hand or Eye, K21, Düsseldorf 
 2012: Do not walk outside this area, Deutsche Guggenheim, Berlin
 2012: Roman Ondak, Musée d’art moderne de la Ville de Paris /ARC, Paris
 2012: Within Reach of Hand and Eye. Kunstsammlung Nordrhein-Westfalen K21, Düsseldorf
 2012: DOCUMENTA 13
 2013: Escena, Museo Nacional Centro de Arte Reina Sofia, Madrid
 2013: Some Thing, The Common Guild, Glasgow
 2014: Roman Ondak, Kaldor Art Projects, Sydney
 2015: Storyboard, Times Museum, Guangzhou
 2016: The Source of Art is in the Life of a People, South London Gallery, London
 2017: History Repeats Itself, KUNSTEN Museum of Modern Art, Aalborg
 2017: Man Walking Toward a Fata Morgana, The Arts Club of Chicago, Chicago
 2018: Objects in the Mirror, BASE Progetti per l’arte Arte, Florence
 2018-2019:  #12 Roman Ondak, mezzaterra 11, Belluno
 2018: Based on True Events, Lovis-Corinth-Preis, Kunstforum Ostdeutsche Galerie, Regensburg
 2021: SK Parking, Kunsthalle Bratislava
 2022: Roman Ondak – Measuring the Universe, Pinakothek der Moderne, Munich

Art in Public Collections  
Ludwig Museum Budapest (Hungary), Slovenská národná galéria/ Slovak National Gallery in Bratislava (Slovakia), Kunsthalle Praha (Czech Republic), TATE Gallery London (UK),  Centre Pompidou, Musée National d’Art Moderne, Paris (France), MUMOK (Museum Moderner Kunst Stiftung Ludwig Wien) Vienna (Austria), Museum of Modern Art, New York (USA), Art Collection Telekom Berlin (Germany), Boros Collection Berlin (Germany), Musée d’art moderne de la Ville de Paris (FR),...

Awards  
 2009: Nomination for Hugo Boss Prize
 2012: Awarded Best Artist of the Year  elected by the Deutsche Bank
 2018: Awarded Lovis Corinth Preis

Bibliography 
 OBRIST H.U. - ZABEL, I. - SCHöLLHAMMER G. - FRANGENDERG F. Roman Ondák : [anlässlich der Ausstellung Roman Ondák "Spirit and Opportunity" im Kölnischen Kunstverein, 1.5. - 27.6.2004]. Köln : Verlag der Buchhandlung Walther König, 2005. 222 pages. .
 HLAVAJOVÁ M. - ELBMAYR S. Roman Ondák. Köln : Verlag der Buchhandlung Walther König, 2007. 152 pages, .
 SCHWENK B. - GRIFFIN J. - ETCHELLS T. - ARRIOLA M. Roman Ondák : measuring the universe. Zürich : JRP Ringier, 2008. 168 nečíslovaných strán. Bawag Foundation Edition ; volume 9Christoph Keller Editions. .
 (ed.) BIRNBAUM D. - VOLZ J. La Biennale di Venezia. : 53. Esposizione Internazionale d` Arte : Fare Mondi = 53rd International Art Exhibition : Making Worlds 1st ed. Venezia : Marsilio, 2009. 307 pages.
 (ed.) KLUMPP, N.- (ed. HüTTE F. - FILIPOVIC E. - De WECK P. - KITTELMANN U. - RATTEMEYER Ch. Roman Ondák : notebook. Ostfildern : Hatje Cantz Verlag, 2012. 298 strán. Deutsche Bank art works. .
 MACEL Christine - PETREŠIN- BACHELEZ Nataša. Promises of the past : a discontinuous history of art in former eastern Europe. Zurich : JRP / Ringier, 2010. 254 pages. .
 Roman Ondak. Based on The True Events : [Lovis-Corinth Preis 2018, anlässlich der Ausstellung 15. 5- 9.9. 2018]. Regensburg : Verlag Kunstforum Ostdeutsch Galerie Regensburg, 2018. 48 pp.

References

External links 
 
 Kadist: 

Performance artists
Modern artists
Conceptual artists
1966 births
Living people